The Lira–Kamdini–Karuma Road, also known as the Karuma–Kamdini–Lira Road, is a road in the Northern Region of Uganda, connecting the town of Lira, in Lira District, with the towns of Kamdini and Karuma, both in Oyam District.

Route description
The road is part of the Tororo to Arua and the Tororo to Juba transportation corridors. The coordinates of the road near Kamdini are 2°13'43.0"N, 32°20'08.0"E (Latitude:2.228599; Longitude:32.335545).

History
The road was upgraded to class II bitumen surface with shoulders and drainage channels during the three years leading up to August 2011 when work was competed. The work extended to Karuma Bridge itself.

See also
 List of roads in Uganda
 Transportation in Uganda
 Economy of Uganda
 Uganda National Roads Authority

References

External links
 Uganda National Road Authority Homepage
 Is the huge road sector budget allocation doing wonders?

Roads in Uganda
Oyam District
Kole District
Lira District